FTI station (also called Food Terminal Junction station) is a railway station located on the South Main Line in Taguig, Metro Manila, Philippines. It is named after its major landmark, the grounds of the formerly state-owned Food Terminal, Inc. which is now renamed as Arca South.

The station is the thirteenth station from Tutuban and is one of two stations serving Taguig, the other station being Nichols.

The station was opened on January 19, 1977 as Food Terminal Junction station, replacing the now-defunct Balagbag station that was located few meters northwest. In 2018, PNR extended the North Shuttle Line southwards from Dela Rosa to FTI as its new terminus, effectively starting on September 10, while northwards from Caloocan to Governor Pascual started on December 3.

Nearby landmarks
The station is near major landmarks such as the Ayala Land development Arca South, Technological University of the Philippines-Taguig Campus, the Sunshine Mall, the Taguig-Pateros District Hospital, a major warehouse of the National Food Authority and, most notably, a series of low-cost housing developments collectively called BLISS Taguig (commonly called "Tenement"). Further away from the station are the Western Bicutan National High School and Signal Village.

Transportation links
FTI station is accessible by jeepneys plying routes on the East Service Road, as well as jeeps entering the FTI complex. In the future, the station will also be integrated with the proposed Taguig Integrated Terminal Exchange as well as the planned Metro Manila Subway.

Station layout

References

Philippine National Railways stations
Railway stations in Metro Manila
Railway stations opened in 1977
Buildings and structures in Taguig